The Bradshaw Mountains ("rough, black range of rocks") are a mountain range in central Arizona, United States, named for brothers Isaac and William D. Bradshaw after their deaths, having been formerly known in English as the Silver Mountain Range.

History
The first known settlements in the Bradshaws were a group of Yavapai people, called the Kwevkapaya who built forts and mined copper from around AD 1100 to 1600.
The Walker party found gold, and within a few years, the Bradshaws were filling up with settlers mining for gold, silver, and copper. In the early part of the 20th century, most of the towns that had sprung up were little more than ghost towns.

Geography

Peaks
 Spruce Mountain – , misnamed for Douglas firs mistaken for Spruces.
 Mount Tritle – , named for Frederick Augustus Tritle Governor of Arizona Territory (1882–1885).
 Towers Mountain – .
 Maverick Mountain – .
 Mount Wasson – .

Geology
The Bradshaw Mountains consist primarily of Precambrian granite, gneiss and schist.

Ecology
The biotic community of the Bradshaws ranges from interior chaparral and montane conifer forest, to plains and desert grassland, and Sonoran desert scrub. Many species of trees are found in the Bradshaws, including Piñon, Alligator Juniper, Ponderosa pine, Blue Spruce, Quaking Aspen, White fir, and Douglas fir. As well, much wildlife is present, including javelina, mountain lion, bobcat, black bear, mule deer, porcupine, fox, skunk, abert's squirrel, rock squirrel, wild turkey, many species of reptiles and amphibians, and many species of birds.

Several creeks have been dammed to form reservoirs, including Lynx Lake, Goldwater Lake, Lake Marapai, Hassayampa Lake, Horsethief Lake, and Cedar Tank.

Human use

Gold was first discovered in the Bradshaws in 1863, over $2,000,000 worth being taken from just the Crown King Mine. Copper and silver were also mined in the early part of the 20th century. Within Mount Union lies the Poland Junction silver mine. Its adit, now sealed, may be accessed from Poland Junction, near Walker.

Ghost towns and other settlements
There are over 40 ghost towns in the Bradshaw Mountains, including Crown King, Bumble Bee, Goodwin, Bradshaw City, Alexandra and Cleator.

Protected areas
Much of the Bradshaw Mountains are on Prescott National Forest land. Other parks include Horsethief Basin Recreational Area, Lynx Lake Recreational Area, and the Castle Creek Wilderness.

See also
 Hieroglyphic Mountains
 Castle Hot Springs (Arizona)

References

Arizona transition zone mountain ranges
Mountain ranges of Yavapai County, Arizona
Mountain ranges of Arizona
Mountain ranges of the Sonoran Desert
Prescott National Forest